Michael John Bailey (born 1 August 1954 in Cheltenham, Gloucestershire) is a retired English cricketer who was a left-handed batsman and bowled right-arm off-break. During his career he played for Hampshire in first-class cricket from 1979–1982 as well as representing the counties of Herefordshire and Wiltshire in one-day cricket.

External links
Michael Bailey on Cricinfo
Michael Bailey on CricketArchive

1954 births
Living people
English cricketers
Hampshire cricketers
Herefordshire cricketers
Wiltshire cricketers
Sportspeople from Cheltenham